Wodonga High School was one of three public secondary schools educating Years 7−12 in Wodonga, Victoria, Australia. It was founded in 1955, and celebrated its 50th anniversary in 2005 under principal, Peter McLean.

In 2005−2006 it formally merged and pooled resources with the other two public secondary schools in Wodonga, Wodonga West Secondary College and Mitchell Secondary College. As of 2006, the former Wodonga High School facility is a specialist senior school for Years 10, 11 and 12, known as Wodonga Senior Secondary College, loosely associated with Wodonga Middle Years College.

Motto
The school's motto was "Labora ut Servias", which roughly translates to "Work to Serve".

Website
Wodonga High School's website was http://www.wodonga.vic.edu.au, but this address has been converted to serve Wodonga Senior Secondary College.

Notable alumni
Mary-Anne Thomas - Minister for Agriculture and Regional Development in the Victorian government.

References

Public high schools in Victoria (Australia)
Educational institutions established in 1955
Defunct schools in Victoria (Australia)
1955 establishments in Australia
Wodonga